Manila is an independently produced twinbill film that pays homage to Lino Brocka's Jaguar and Ishmael Bernal's Manila By Night. Piolo Pascual co-produced and starred in both episodes.

Cast
 Piolo Pascual as William / Phillip
 Rosanna Roces as Juliana
 Jay Manalo as Tristan
 Alessandra de Rossi as Aleria
 Anita Linda as Seniora Aleria
 William Martinez as Dr. Soriano
 Angelica Panganiban as Sydney
 Baron Geisler as Jorge
 Menggie Cobarrubias as Hector
 Marissa Delgado as Rodelya
 Cherrie Madrigal as Nora
 Jiro Manio as Nino
 Aleck Bovick as Limelyn
 John Lapus as Julie
 Katherine Luna as Bernadette

Production 
Shot on 16mm black-and-white film before being transferred to 35mm, Manila is divided into a Day episode (which is loosely based on Bernal's 1980 film Manila by Night) and a Night episode (inspired by Brocka's 1979 film Jaguar). The script is co-written by Adolf Alix, Jr. and Ramon Sarmiento and co-directed by Raya Martin and Adolfo Alix, Jr.

For the Day segment, Piolo Pascual portrays William, a drug addict who tries to rebuild his sense of self and reconnect with the people around him. Piolo's character is named William in honor of William Martinez who played the lead role in Manila By Night. The Day segment also stars Angelica Panganiban and Rosanna Roces.

For the Night segment, Piolo portrays Philip, a bodyguard for a mayor's son who mistakenly believes that his boss considers him as part of the family. Piolo's character is named Philip in honor of Phillip Salvador who played the lead role in Jaguar. The Night segment also stars Alessandra de Rossi, Jay Manalo, Jiro Manio, and Anita Linda.

Release 
Manila had its world premiere (as one of the six films to have a special screening) in the 62nd Cannes Film Festival (May 12 to May 24, 2010). This film was also exhibited at the Films Around The World section of the 31st Moscow International Film Festival to be held from June 20 to June 24, 2010. It also competed in the 25th Warsaw International Film Festival for the Free Spirit Award (October 8 and 9, 2009) 

Manila had its Philippine premiere on July 17, 2010 at the Cultural Center of the Philippines as the opening film of the 5th Cinemalaya Film Festival. Regular screenings started on July 22, 2009 in selected theaters nationwide. This film was also screened in Vladivostok, Oldenburg and Bangkok.

See also
 Jaguar (1979 film)
 Manila By Night

References

External links

2009 films
Philippine independent films
Films set in Manila
Star Cinema films
2009 drama films
2000s Tagalog-language films
2009 independent films
Films directed by Adolfo Alix Jr.
Films directed by Raya Martin